I lexi is a Greek literary periodical published by Antonis Fostieris and Thanassis Niarchos in Athens since 1981.

External links
Selected content from issues 1999-2004

Literary magazines published in Greece
Modern Greek literature
Magazines established in 1981
Mass media in Athens
Greek-language magazines
1981 establishments in Greece